Thomas Jay Hambridge (born December 20, 1960) is an American rock, country, and blues, producer, songwriter, musician and vocalist. Hambridge has received two Grammy Awards, an ASCAP award, seven Grammy nominations, seven Boston Music Awards, and has been inducted into the Buffalo Hall of Fame. In December 2015, Tom was given the key to his hometown of Buffalo, NY with Mayor Byron Brown declaring December 28 "Tom Hambridge Day." Hambridge's songs have been recorded by several notable artists and have been featured in movie productions, commercials and television programs. He has been referred to as "The White Willie Dixon" by Rock and Roll Hall of Fame Inductee Buddy Guy and Susan Tedeschi's "Secret Weapon".

Biography
Born and raised in Buffalo, New York, Hambridge began learning the drums at the age of 5. He played his first paying gig, a bar mitzvah, in third grade. Throughout his school years, Hambridge played in garage bands, his high school orchestra and jazz band. After graduating from high school in 1979, he received a scholarship at Boston's Berklee College of Music.

 
He received his degree in Professional Music in 1983. After graduation, he worked for three years as drummer and lead singer for the blues guitarist Roy Buchanan. While working with Buchanan, Hambridge contributed as a musician on Buchanan's release, Live: Amazing Grace. In the meantime, he formed the band "T.H. and the Wreckage". In 1988, the band released Born to Rock, one of several independent, self-produced albums Hambridge has completed. Born To Rock was the first of the many Boston Music Awards he has received. In the meantime, he assisted promoters assemble backup bands for artists such as Bo Diddley, Percy Sledge, Chuck Berry, Gary Puckett, and Sha Na Na.

Hambridge released his own album Still Running in 1996.

In 1997, he produced Susan Tedeschi's Just Won't Burn. Hambridge wrote Tedeschi's Top 10 hits "Rock Me Right" and "It Hurt So Bad". In the meantime, he also released his own album Balderdash in 2000. Hambridge received a subsequent 2004 Grammy nomination (Grammy Award for Best Contemporary Blues Album) for his contributions on Johnny Winter's release I'm A Bluesman  ("Cheatin' Blues" and "Lone Wolf"). Shortly thereafter, Hambridge released his album Bang N' Roll (2004) and the album Live (2007).

In 2008, he received Grammy nominations (Grammy Award for Best Traditional Blues Album) for his work on Buddy Guy's Skin Deep. Skin Deep debuted at number 68 on the Billboard 200 which was the highest position of any of Guy's previous albums, and was number 1 on the Billboard Blues Album Chart. Hambridge released his own album Boogieman (2009). In 2011, he won the Grammy Award for Best Contemporary Blues Album for co-writing and producing Buddy Guy's album Living Proof.

He was credited as the producer, songwriter and percussionist for George Thorogood and the Destroyers 2011 release 2120 South Michigan Ave., which included the song "Going Back" that reached number 1 on Classic Rock Radio. Also in 2011, he wrote and produced B. B. King and Buddy Guy's duet "Stay Around A Little Longer."

Other recognized 2011 successes include writing/co-writing all songs on Quinn Sullivan's release Cyclone (2011, number 7 on the Billboard Blues charts, July 30, 2011). Later in 2013, Hambridge would do the same on Quinn Sullivan's release "Getting There" which charted at 38 on the Billboard Blues Charts.

In 2015, Hambridge earned his second Grammy Award for Best Blues Album for his contributions as a musician, producer, composer and mixer on Buddy Guy's Born to Play Guitar.

In 2016, Hambridge produced Mike Zito's album "Make Blues Not War" which debuted at number 1 on the Billboard Charts on December 10, 2016 and earned his seventh Grammy Award Nomination for his production work on Bloodline.

Hambridge's songs and productions have appeared on a variety of television shows, movies and commercials.  These include "It Hurt's So Bad" (Susan Tedeschi) on PBS's Austin City Limits, Autumn Hearts, VH1's Born To Diva, NBC's Conan O'Brien, and The Late Late Show with Craig Kilborn. In addition, "Rock Me Right" (Susan Tedeschi) appeared in Autumn Hearts, David Letterman Show, NASCAR Rocks II (1999), and Flintstones in Viva Rock Vegas. "I Fell in Love" (Susan Tedeschi) appeared on the Bug soundtrack. Plus, "Road Trip" and "I Got A New Car" (Tom Hambridge) appeared in the movie Cars. "Flying By" (Billy Ray Cyrus) appeared in the film, Flying By.

Hambridge has performed multiple times at the White House.  On February 21, 2012, he joined Buddy Guy, Keb Mo, Susan Tedeschi, Derek Trucks, Mick Jagger, BB King and others in a performance for the White House's "Red, White and Blues" Black History Month celebration concert.  During the performance, President Barack Obama provided a brief history of the Blues and accompanied the group during the song "Sweet Home Chicago".  On October 14, 2015, Hambridge returned to the White House with Buddy Guy, Marty Sammon, Trombone Shorty, Carol Burnett, Queen Latifah, MC Lyte, Keb Mo, Smokey Robinson and others for "A Celebration of American Creativity: In Performance at the White House", commemorating the 50th anniversary of the National Endowment for the Humanities.

Credits
As leader

As contributing artist

References

External links

Discography at Billboard Magazine
ASCAP – Tom Hambridge Registered Songs and Additional Information
AllMusic Biography

1960 births
Living people
American blues singers
American country singer-songwriters
American blues drummers
Grammy Award winners
Musicians from Buffalo, New York
Singer-songwriters from New York (state)
Berklee College of Music alumni
Record producers from New York (state)
20th-century American drummers
American male drummers
Country musicians from New York (state)
20th-century American male musicians
American male singer-songwriters